Sadievo is a village in Aytos Municipality, in Burgas Province, in southeastern Bulgaria.

References

Villages in Burgas Province